Aldridgea ignatiana is the lone species of fungi belonging to the Aldridgea genus. It was documented in 1959 by Brazilian mycologist Johannes (João Evangelista) Rick.

References 

Incertae sedis
Agaricomycetes
Taxa named by Johannes Rick